Marcel Proulx (born 6 March 1946 in L'Orignal, Ontario) is a retired Canadian politician.

Proulx is a former member of the Liberal Party of Canada in the House of Commons of Canada, having represented the riding of Hull—Aylmer from 1999 to 2011. Proulx is a former administrator, businessman, claim adjuster, and executive assistant. He is a former Parliamentary Secretary to the Minister of Transport and is the current Chair of the Sub-Committee on Private Members' Business of the Standing Committee on Procedure and House Affairs and Deputy Chair of Committees of the Whole, frequently being the Acting Speaker.

Proulx ran for Speaker of the House of Commons of Canada in the 39th Canadian Parliament.  Fellow Liberal Peter Milliken won on the first ballot.

Marcel Proulx was a supporter of Michael Ignatieff during the last leadership campaign of the Liberal Party of Canada.  However, he served as Quebec lieutenant for Stéphane Dion in 2007. On 16 October 2007, after much speculation, Proulx announced his resignation as Quebec lieutenant. The position of Quebec Lieutenant was offered to Pablo Rodriguez and Denis Coderre but both refused. The position was later given to Senator Céline Hervieux-Payette.

He was defeated by NDP candidate Nycole Turmel in the 2011 Canadian election in a landslide. Turmel would also succeed him as the Chief Opposition Whip in the 41st Canadian Parliament.

He is the first Liberal candidate ever defeated in Hull-Aylmer's 94-year history. Proulx became a real estate agent a few months after his defeat.

Electoral record

Note: Conservative vote is compared to the total of the Canadian Alliance vote and Progressive Conservative vote in the 2000 election.

	

Note: Canadian Alliance vote is compared to the Reform vote in 1999 by-election.

References

External links
 
 https://www.cbc.ca/news/canada/ottawa/hull-aylmer-mp-slammed-for-golf-gift-worth-thousands-1.636431

1946 births
Living people
21st-century Canadian politicians
Liberal Party of Canada MPs
Members of the House of Commons of Canada from Quebec
People from the United Counties of Prescott and Russell
Politicians from Gatineau